The Oxford Companion to Philosophy (1995; second edition 2005) is a reference work in philosophy edited by the philosopher Ted Honderich and published by Oxford University Press. The second edition included some 300 new entries. The new edition has over 2,200 entries and 291 contributors.

Publication history
Honderich, Ted (ed.). The Oxford Companion to Philosophy (New York: Oxford University Press, 1995) 
Honderich, Ted (ed.). The Oxford Companion to Philosophy (Second Edition) (New York: Oxford University Press, 2005)

References

External links
The OUP page for the Oxford Companion to Philosophy second edition

1995 non-fiction books
2005 non-fiction books
Books by Ted Honderich
Encyclopedias of philosophy
English-language books
Oxford University Press reference books
Philosophy books